C.P.D Aberffraw (locally referred to as Berffro) is a football team representing the historic village of Aberffraw on the island of Anglesey. They compete in the North Wales Coast West Football League Premier Division, in the fourth tier of the Welsh football pyramid. Despite their name, the club is actually based a couple of miles outside of Aberffraw, in the nearby village of Bryn Du. They wear a yellow home shirt, with black shorts and socks.

The club's ground, Cae Cynlas, which is actually situated in nearby Bryn Du, was chosen to host several games during the 2019 Inter Games Football Tournament.

Current squad

Football clubs in Wales
Welsh Alliance League clubs
Sport in Anglesey
Aberffraw
North Wales Coast Football League clubs